Emil Schünemann (18 April 1882 – 26 May 1964) was a German cinematographer

Selected filmography
 In Nacht und Eis (1912)
 The Plague of Florence (1919)
 Madame Récamier (1920)
 The Spiders (1920)
 Humanity Unleashed (1920)
 The Little Napoleon (1923)
 The Fifth Street (1923)
 Aelita: Queen of Mars (1924)
 The Prince and the Maid (1924)
 A Woman for 24 Hours (1925)
 Semi-Silk (1925)
 Rags and Silk (1925)
 Upstairs and Downstairs (1925)
 The Story of Lilian Hawley (1925)
 The Old Ballroom (1925)
 The Adventurers (1926)
 Light Cavalry (1927)
 The Glass Boat (1927)
 Intoxicated Love (1927)
 Nameless Woman (1927)
 The Hunt for the Bride (1927)
 The Island of Forbidden Kisses (1927)
 The King of Carnival (1928)
 The Joker (1928)
 Rasputin (1928)
 The Beloved of His Highness (1928)
 Fight of the Tertia (1929)
 A Throw of Dice (1929)
 The Man in the Dark (1930)
 The Return of Raffles (1933)
 Maid Happy (1933)
 Manolescu, Prince of Thieves (1933)
 The Riders of German East Africa (1934)
 The Black Whale (1934)
 Artist Love (1935)
 Paul and Pauline (1936)
 Love's Awakening (1936)
 The Call of the Sea (1951)
 Anna Susanna (1953)

Bibliography
 Trimborn, Jürgen. Leni Riefenstahl: A Life. Macmillan, 2007 .

External links

1882 births
1964 deaths
German cinematographers
Film people from Berlin